Balmer Heath is a village in Shropshire, England.

External links

Villages in Shropshire